"Hey Stoopid" is a song by American rock singer Alice Cooper and the title track from his 12th solo studio album, Hey Stoopid (1991). The song reached number 78 in the United States, number 21 in the United Kingdom, number seven in Finland, and number five in Norway. Slash, Ozzy Osbourne, Steve Vai and Joe Satriani make guest appearances on the song.

Personnel
 Alice Cooper – vocals, harmonica
 Mickey Curry – drums
 Hugh McDonald – bass
 Stef Burns – guitar
 Steve Vai – guitar
 Joe Satriani – guitar, backing vocals
 Slash – guitar
 Steve Croes – synclavier
 Ozzy Osbourne – backing vocals
 Zachary Nevel – backing vocals

Charts

References

Alice Cooper songs
1991 singles
1991 songs
Epic Records singles
Glam metal songs
Song recordings produced by Peter Collins (record producer)
Songs written by Alice Cooper
Songs written by Jack Ponti